Kevin Williamson may refer to:

 Kevin Williamson (writer) (born 1961), Scottish writer
 Kevin Williamson (screenwriter) (born 1965), American screenwriter, producer, director and actor
 Kevin Williamson (swimmer) (born 1959), Irish Olympic swimmer
 Kevin D. Williamson (born 1972), American columnist, pundit, and author